Hypselodoris lacteola is a species of sea slug or dorid nudibranch, a marine gastropod mollusk in the family Chromodorididae.

Distribution
This nudibranch is known only from New Caledonia in the Southern Pacific Ocean.

Description
Hypselodoris lacteola has a white body and mantle and a purple tip to the foot. It has white gills and rhinophores outlined with purple. This species can reach a total length of at least .

References

Chromodorididae
Gastropods described in 1995